Lutshan is a village in Kyain Seikgyi Township (also called Win-Yay Township in Karen language), Kawkareik District, in the Kayin State of Myanmar.

References

External links
 "Lutshan Map – Satellite Images of Lutshan" Maplandia World Gazetteer

Populated places in Kayin State